The Citizen Cup was a women's tennis tournament played on outdoor clay courts. It was the seventh edition of the Citizen Cup and was a Tier II tournament on the 1993 WTA Tour. The tournament took place from 26 April to 2 May 1993 at the Am Rothenbaum venue, in Hamburg, Germany.

Seles stabbing
This tournament would later attract infamy for being the location where then World No. 1 Monica Seles was stabbed during a singles quarterfinal match with then World No. 14 Magdalena Maleeva by an obsessed fan of Steffi Graf, Günter Parche. The stabbing prompted an increase in security at subsequent tennis events. Seles would not return to professional tennis until August 1995 following the incident, and never played in Germany again.

Entrants

Seeds

Other entrants
The following players received entry from the qualifying draw:
  Petra Begerow
  Beate Reinstadler
  Maria Strandlund
The following players received entry from a Lucky loser spot:
  Elena Brioukhovets

Finals

Singles

 Arantxa Sánchez Vicario defeated  Steffi Graf, 6–3, 6–3
 It was Sánchez Vicario's fourth title of the year, and the twelfth of her career.

Doubles

 Steffi Graf /  Rennae Stubbs defeated  Larisa Neiland /  Jana Novotná, 6–4, 7–6(7–5)

References

External links
 ITF tournament edition details

Tennis tournaments in Germany
Citizen Cup
WTA Hamburg
Tennis controversies
1993 in German women's sport
1993 in German tennis